{{DISPLAYTITLE:C3H7NO2}}
The molecular formula C3H7NO2 may refer to:

 Alanine
 beta-Alanine
 Ethyl carbamate
 Isopropyl nitrite
 Propyl nitrite
 Lactamide
 Nitropropanes
 1-Nitropropane
 2-Nitropropane
 Sarcosine